The Great Plains short-horned lizard (Phrynosoma brevirostris) is a horned lizard species native to Canada and the United States.

References

Phrynosoma
Reptiles of Canada
Reptiles of the United States
Reptiles described in 1858
Taxa named by Charles Frédéric Girard